Iota Piscis Austrini (ι Piscis Austrini) is a solitary, blue-white hued star in the southern constellation of Piscis Austrinus. It has an apparent visual magnitude of +4.35 and is around 500 light years from the Sun. This is an A-type main sequence star with a stellar classification of A0 V. It has a magnitude 11.4 visual companion located at an angular separation of 20 arc seconds along a position angle of 290°, as of 1910.

Iota Piscis Austrini is moving through the Galaxy at a speed of 29.7 km/s relative to the Sun. Its projected Galactic orbit carries it between 18,400 and 24,300 light years from the center of the Galaxy.

Naming

References

B-type main-sequence stars
Piscis Austrini, Iota
Piscis Austrinus
Durchmusterung objects
Piscis Austrini, 09
107380
206742
8305